Sparrow House may refer to:

Sparrow House (Portland, Maine), listed on the National Register of Historic Places in Portland, Maine
Richard Sparrow House, Plymouth, Massachusetts, listed on the NRHP in Plymouth County, Massachusetts
James Sparrow House, Charleston, South Carolina, listed on the National Register of Historic Places in Charleston, South Carolina
Sparrow House (Montreal), a residence in the Îlot-Trafalgar-Gleneagles historic block in Montreal